The 2011 Luton Borough Council election for the whole of Luton Borough Council (a unitary authority) was held on 5 May 2011. The Labour Party strengthened its control of the council, mainly at the expense of the Liberal Democrats, winning three-quarters of the seats (albeit with less than half of the votes cast). The Liberal Democrats were marginally outvoted by the Conservatives (see table, below) but won twice as many seats, probably due to not putting up candidates for all available seats (only Labour and the Conservatives had the maximum number of candidates).

Results

By ward

References

2011
2011 English local elections
21st century in Bedfordshire